Nagial is a village and union council of Jhelum District in the Punjab province of Pakistan. It is part of Sohawa Tehsil,. The main tribe of Nagial village are Jatts. They dominate the local politics

References 

Populated places in Tehsil Sohawa
Union councils of Sohawa Tehsil